Janette Pallas is the Business Incubation and Enterprise manager, De Montfort University, Leicester. In 2008, she was awarded the Queen's Award for Enterprise Promotion.

References

Queen's Award for Enterprise Promotion (2008)
British businesspeople
Living people
Year of birth missing (living people)